"Bringing on Back the Good Times" is a song by The Love Affair.  The song was released internationally in early July 1969.  It became a Top 10 hit in the United Kingdom, New Zealand and Israel and was also a minor hit in Canada for 'Fast Eddy' in 1971.

Chart history
The Love Affair

'Fast Eddy'

References

External links
 Lyrics of this song
 

1969 songs
1969 singles
1971 singles
CBS Records singles
British songs
Love Affair (band) songs
Song recordings produced by Mike Smith (British record producer)